Living in Captivity is an American sitcom that aired on Fox on Friday nights from September 11, 1998 to October 16, 1998.

Premise
The series centered on the residents of the gated community of Woodland Heights, California. Among those shown were Will Merrik, a Christian novelist, his Jewish attorney wife Becca, Carmine Santucci, an auto parts mogul, his wife Lisa, and Curtis Cooke, a disc jockey, and his pregnant wife Tamara. Gordon was the gay security guard.

Cast
Matt Letscher as Will Merrik
Melinda McGraw as Becca Merrik
Lenny Venito as Carmine Santucci
Mia Cottet as Lisa Santucci
Dondré Whitfield as Curtis Cooke
Kira Arne as Tamara Cooke
Terry Rhoads as Gordon

Episodes

References

Fox Broadcasting Company original programming
1990s American sitcoms
Television shows set in California
1998 American television series debuts
1998 American television series endings
Television series by 20th Century Fox Television
English-language television shows